This is a list of division winners and playoff matches in the regionally organized Eccellenza 2008–2009, which is the 6th level of Italian football.  A total of 36 teams are promoted to Serie D for the 2009–10 season.

The first-placed team from each of the 28 divisions is promoted directly. The seven winners of the national playoffs are also promoted.  Finally, the 36th spot is reserved for the winner of the Coppa Italia Dilettanti.  This year, the winner was Virtus Casarano, which also won direct promotion as divisional winner in the region of Apuglia, thus Castel Rigone of Eccellenza Umbria won promotion as Coppa Italia Dilettanti runners-up.

In addition, L'Aquila were handed special promotion from the Federation as they were unable to play the two remaining matches following a massive earthquake in the city.

Division winners
This is the list of final division winners in the regular season phase:

Regional playoffs
The following regional committees did not organize playoffs and instead directly admitted league runners-up to the national phase:

Emilia-Romagna A: Pallavicino
Emilia-Romagna B: Del Conca Morciano
Friuli-Venezia Giulia: Monfalcone
Lazio A: Latina
Lazio B: Fondi
Liguria: Loanesi San Francesco
Trentino-Alto Adige/Südtirol: Maia Alta Obermais
Veneto A: Legnago Salus
Veneto B: LiaPiave

Abruzzo
Differently than with other regions, the Abruzzo phase involved teams from 3rd to 6th place, due to second-placed L'Aquila being promoted by deliberation of the Lega Nazionale Dilettantistica ("Amateur National League"), as the team was declared unable to complete the season due to the massive earthquake that struck the city in April.

Playoff semifinals
Games held on May 10 and 17, 2009

|}

Playoff final
Game held on May 23, 2009 in Celano (neutral field)

|}

Apulia

Playoff semifinals
Games held on April 19 and 26, 2009

|}

Playoff finals
Games held on May 3 and 10, 2009

|}

Basilicata

Playoff semifinals
Games held on May 6 and 10, 2009

|}

Playoff final
Game held on May 16, 2009 in Picerno (neutral field)

|}

Calabria

Playoff semifinals
Games held on May 3 and 10, 2009

|}

Playoff finals
Games held on May 13 and 17, 2009

|}

Campania A

Playoff semifinals
Games held on May 10, 2009

|}

Playoff final
Game held on May 17, 2009

|}

Campania B

Playoff semifinals
Games held on May 10, 2009

|}

Playoff final
Game held on May 17, 2009

|}

Lombardy A

Playoff semifinals
Games held on May 10, 2009

|}

Playoff final
Game held on May 16, 2009

|}

Lombardy B

Playoff semifinals
Games held on May 10, 2009

|}

Playoff final
Game held on May 16, 2009

|}

Lombardy C

Playoff semifinals
Games held on May 10, 2009

|}

Playoff final
Game held on May 16, 2009

|}

Marche

Playoff semifinals
Games held on May 3 and 10, 2009

|}

Playoff final
Game held on May 17, 2009 in Ancona (neutral field)

|}

Molise

Playoff semifinals
Games held on May 3 and 10, 2009

|}

Playoff final
Game held on May 17, 2009

|}

Piedmont & Aosta Valley A

Playoff semifinals
Games held on April 26 and 29, 2009

|}

Playoff finals
Games held on May 3 and 10, 2009

|}

Piedmont & Aosta Valley B

Playoff semifinals
Games held on April 26 and 29, 2009

|}

Playoff finals
Games held on May 3 and 10, 2009

|}

Sardinia

Playoff semifinals
Games held on May 3 and 10, 2009

|}

Playoff final
Game held on May 17, 2009 in Terralba (neutral field)

|}

Sicily A

Playoff semifinals
Games held on April 19, 2009 in Mazara del Vallo and Alcamo (neutral fields)

|}

Playoff final
Game held on April 26, 2009 in Campobello di Mazara (neutral field)

|}

Sicily B

Playoff semifinals
Games held on April 19, 2009 in Belpasso and Caltanissetta (neutral fields)

|}

Playoff final
Game held on April 26, 2009 in Mazara del Vallo (neutral field)

|}

Tuscany A

Playoff semifinals
Games held on April 26 and May 3, 2009

|}

Playoff finals
Games held on May 10 and 17, 2009

|}

Tuscany B

Playoff semifinals
Games held on April 26 and May 3, 2009

|}

Playoff finals
Games held on May 10 and 17, 2009

|}

Umbria
Umbria admitted teams from 3rd to 6th place into playoffs, due to league runners-up Castel Rigone being promoted directly into Serie D as Coppa Italia Dilettanti finalists.

Playoff semifinals
Games held on May 3 and 10, 2009

|}

Playoff final
Game held on May 17, 2009 in Ponte San Giovanni (neutral field)

|}

National playoffs
National playoffs involve 28 teams and assign 7 promotion spots. They are divided in two different rounds.

First round
Played on May 24 and 31, 2009

|}

Second round
Played on June 7 and 14, 2009; Match #5 played on June 14 and 21, 2009

|}

Notes and references

6
2009